Humlab is an interdisciplinary digital lab at Umeå University in the north east of Sweden. Its organization was founded in 1997   and it opened as a functioning digital space in 2000. It has been the venue for numerous conferences, workshops and seminars dealing with issues surrounding digital media, the humanities and interdisciplinary research and development. It functions as a teaching space, a laboratory and as a studio.

The Humlab website contains an archive of streamed seminars and online papers. 
Current themes include participatory media, digital cultural heritage, emergent communication and critical perspectives.

Humlab (the laboratory) 
The main premises were founded by the university's Faculty of Arts and are situated in the cellar below Umeå University Library.

References

External links 
 Humlab's website

Umeå University
Research institutes in Sweden